Bustillos is a surname. Notable people with the surname include:

Edwin Bustillos (1964–2003), Mexican scientist
Juan Bustillos Montalvo (born 1955), Mexican politician
Victorino Márquez Bustillos (1858–1941), Venezuelan lawyer and politician 

Surnames of Spanish origin